Julia Görges was the two-time defending champion, but lost in the quarterfinals to Caroline Wozniacki.

Serena Williams won the title, defeating Jessica Pegula in the final, 6–3, 6–4. This was Williams’ first title since giving birth to her daughter Olympia, and made her the first player in the open era to win singles titles across four decades. This was also her 73rd and last title before announcing her retirement in 2022.

Seeds

Draw

Finals

Top half

Bottom half

Qualifying

Seeds

Qualifiers

Lucky losers

Qualifying draw

First qualifier

Second qualifier

Third qualifier

Fourth qualifier

References

External Links
Main Draw
Qualifying Draw

2020 Women's Singles
ASB Classic - Singles